Is-Selongey Football is a French association football team formed in 1920 as US Selongey, which then became Sporting Club de Selongey in 1931. SC Selongey merged with Réveil Is-sur-Tille Football in June 2018, taking the current Is-Selongey Football name. They are based in Selongey, Bourgogne, France and are currently playing in the Championnat National 3, the fifth tier in the French football league system.

Current squad

References

External links
 

1920 establishments in France
Sport in Côte-d'Or
Association football clubs established in 1920
Football clubs in Bourgogne-Franche-Comté